Lehigh University (LU) is a private research university in Bethlehem, Pennsylvania in the Lehigh Valley region of eastern Pennsylvania. The university was established in 1865 by businessman Asa Packer and was originally affiliated with the Episcopal Church. 

Lehigh University's undergraduate programs have been coeducational since the 1971–72 academic year. , the university had 5,047 undergraduate students and 1,802 graduate students.

Lehigh has five colleges: the P.C. Rossin College of Engineering and Applied Science, the College of Arts and Sciences, the College of Business, the College of Education, and the College of Health. The College of Arts and Sciences is the largest, with 35% of the university's students. The university offers the Bachelor of Arts, Bachelor of Science, Master of Arts, Master of Science, Master of Business Administration, Master of Engineering, Master of Education, and Doctor of Philosophy degrees. It is classified among "Doctoral Universities: High Research Activity".

Lehigh alumni and faculty include Nobel Peace Prize Laureates, Pulitzer Prize winners, Fulbright Fellows, members of the American Academy of Arts & Sciences and of the National Academy of Sciences, National Medal of Science winners, and a recipient of the Presidential Medal of Freedom.

Campus 

Located in the Lehigh Valley, the university is a  drive from Philadelphia, and an  drive from New York City.

Lehigh encompasses , including  of recreational and playing fields and 150 buildings comprising four million square feet of floor space. It is organized into three contiguous campuses on and around South Mountain, including:
the Asa Packer Campus, built into the northern slope of the mountain, is Lehigh's original and predominant campus;
the Mountaintop Campus, atop South Mountain, featuring an intramural sports field as well as Iacocca Hall; and
the Murray H. Goodman Campus, immediately south, where a 16,000-seat stadium and other sports facilities are located.

In May 2012, Lehigh became the recipient of a gift of 755 acres of property in nearby Upper Saucon Township from the Donald B. and Dorothy L. Stabler Foundation. The gift from the estate of the long-time benefactor allowed the university to expand its footprint to now comprise 2,350 acres across all its campuses, and to consider its long-term potential uses.

Admissions
U.S. News & World Report classifies Lehigh's selectivity as "Most Selective." For the Class of 2022 (enrolled fall 2018), Lehigh received 15,623 applications and accepted 3,418 (22%). Per Lehigh's school newspaper, 2022 marked the most selective year with a 19% acceptance rate for regular decision applicants.

Rankings

U.S. News & World Report ranked Lehigh tied for 49th among "National Universities", tied for 13th for "Best Undergraduate Teaching", and 29th for "Best Value Schools" in its 2022 edition of "Best Colleges". The Economist ranked Lehigh seventh among national universities in its 2015 ranking of non-vocational U.S. colleges ranked by alumni earnings above expectation.

Lehigh was a 2020 recipient of the Campus Sustainability Achievement Award from the Association for the Advancement of Sustainability in Higher Education for its participation in the Solar Collaboration Project along with Dickinson College, Muhlenberg College, and Lafayette College.

Academics

, Lehigh has 540 full-time faculty members, with 95% holding a doctorate degree or the highest degree in their field. Faculty members are required to have a minimum of four office hours per week.

Lehigh's average class size is 28 students; the student-to-faculty ratio is 9:1.

Lehigh University offers undergraduate enrollment in all colleges but the College of Education. Students are able to take courses or major/minor in a subject outside of their respective college. The university operates on a semester system.

P.C. Rossin College of Engineering and Applied Science

Graduates of Lehigh's engineering programs invented the escalator and founded Packard Motor Car Company and the companies that built the locks and lockgates of the Panama Canal. Other notable alumni include Roger Penske, Lee Iacocca, John W. Fisher, and Terry Hart. Tau Beta Pi, the engineering honor society, was founded at Lehigh. George Tamaro graduated with a master's degree in civil engineering; he became the 2005 recipient of the John Fritz Medal awarded by the American Association of Engineering Societies.

College of Business
In 2012, BusinessWeek ranked Lehigh's College of Business 31st in the nation among undergraduate business programs. Lehigh's finance program is particularly strong, ranked as seventh overall undergraduate finance program in the nation by BusinessWeek. The accounting program is also strong, ranked as the 21st best undergraduate program in the nation by BusinessWeek. Additionally, U.S. News & World Report ranked Lehigh's part-time MBA 20th in the nation in 2018 rankings. Entrepreneur Magazine and The Princeton Review named Lehigh the 24th best undergraduate college for entrepreneurship in 2012.

College of Arts and Sciences
Based in Maginnes Hall, Lehigh offers a variety of humanities courses and visual arts programs and many music programs, including a marching band, the Wind Ensemble, and the Philharmonic orchestra. In addition to the sciences, English and Journalism are particularly strong, with a long history dating back to Richard Harding Davis's days.  It has a dedicated Humanities Center, which is the site for many literature and other arts-based programs, including the DWS, or Drown Writers Series.

Lehigh also has a program called ArtsLehigh, oriented towards enhancing interest in the arts on campus.

College of Education
More than 7,000 students have received master's, education specialist, PA Department of Education teaching certificates and certifications, doctoral degrees, and professional certificates from Lehigh's College of Education .

College of Health 
Lehigh's College of Health offers classes in biostatistics, epidemiology, population health data science, and more. It officially opened on August 21, 2020, and will be the first in the world to offer undergraduate, graduate and executive degrees in population health. It will be based at the Health, Science, and Technology (HST) building which opened officially in January 2022.

Athletics

As a member of the Patriot League, Lehigh competes in 25 different NCAA Division I sports. Lehigh's 2006 student-athlete graduation rate of 97% ranked 12th among all 326 NCAA Division I institutions.  In 2002, it won the inaugural USA Today/NCAA Foundation Award for having the nation's top graduation rate of all Division I institutions.

Lehigh graduates have gone on to professional careers in the National Football League, Major League Baseball, Major League Soccer, and the National Basketball Association as players, scouts, coaches, and owners.  Lehigh graduates have competed in the Super Bowl and won gold medals for the US at the Olympics. And while not a school sport, a number of graduates such as Roger Penske, Al Holbert, and John Fitch went on to successful careers in auto racing.

Basketball

Lehigh's fifth trip to the NCAA tournament in 2012 proved to be their most notable to date, thanks to its first-round game as a #15 seed on March 16, 2012, against the #2 seed Duke Blue Devils.  Despite being a heavy underdog, thanks to CJ McCollum's 30-point heroics, the Mountain Hawks pulled off the stunning upset, defeating the Blue Devils 75-70 and making it only the sixth time that a 15th seed had defeated a second seed.

Wrestling
The most storied athletic program at Lehigh is its wrestling team. The program began in 1910. Over the past several decades it has turned out 158 All-Americans and had numerous squads finish with Top 20 NCAA national rankings, including the highest finish at the NCAA tournament as second in 1939.  Under coach Greg Strobel, Lehigh dominated the EIWA (The Patriot League does not sponsor wrestling). On April 15, 2008, the athletic department announced the hiring of a former assistant coach and two-time national champion and two-time winner of the EIWA Coach of the Year (2009, 2012) Pat Santoro as Lehigh's next head wrestling coach.
Home dual meets and tournaments take place on campus at the Leeman-Turner Arena at Grace Hall.
Grace Hall has historically been the site of Lehigh's matches, but in 2013 the building had been converted into the Caruso Wrestling Complex, with a visiting area and a 'Wall of Fame'.  The latter lists various Lehigh National Champions, in their respective weight class. In 2017, Lehigh wrestler and Bethlehem native Darian Cruz won the NCAA national wrestling tournament, becoming the team's first National Champion wrestler since Zach Rey won the heavyweight title in 2011.

"The Rivalry"

Lehigh University is notable for its rivalry in sports and academics with nearby Lafayette College. Since 1884, the two football teams have met more than 150 times, making "The Rivalry" the most played in the history of college football. As of their last game, played on November 17, 2018, Lafayette holds the series lead, with a record of 78-71-5, although Lehigh has won the previous four matchups (2015-2018). It is also the longest uninterrupted rivalry in college football, with the teams playing at least once every year since 1897. This game is sold out long before gameday each year. For the 150th meeting, the teams played in Yankee Stadium in New York City on November 22, 2014; Lafayette won, 27–7.

Greek letter organizations
A large majority of Lehigh's social fraternities and sororities have their own university-owned houses; most of the fraternities and sororities are on the "Hill" along Upper and Lower Sayre Park Roads. Approximately 34% of undergraduates are members of a fraternity or sorority. During new member education, Greek membership rises to almost 45%. There are 13 fraternities, all of which are housed on campus, and 8 sororities, all of which are housed on campus:

NIC fraternities

Alpha Epsilon Pi
Chi Phi
Chi Psi
Delta Chi
Delta Upsilon
Phi Delta Theta
Phi Sigma Kappa
Psi Upsilon
Sigma Phi Epsilon
Theta Chi

NPC sororities

Alpha Gamma Delta
Alpha Omicron Pi
Alpha Phi
Gamma Phi Beta
Kappa Alpha Theta
Kappa Delta
Pi Beta Phi
Zeta Tau Alpha

CGC fraternities and sororities 

Kappa Alpha Psi  
Sigma Gamma Rho  
Lambda Sigma Upsilon  
Lambda Theta Alpha  
Mu Sigma Upsilon  

1.Non-Residential.

In addition to the 31 social fraternities and sororities, there are also a number of professional and honor fraternities and sororities on campus. It is most well known for Tau Beta Pi the engineering honor society since it was founded at Lehigh.

Professional fraternities and sororities

Alpha Chi Sigma Chemistry
Alpha Omega Epsilon Engineering
Alpha Phi Omega Service
Beta Alpha Psi Accounting
Kappa Kappa Psi Band
Phi Sigma Pi Honors
Sigma Phi Delta Engineering

Honor societies

Alpha Alpha Alpha First Generation College
Alpha Pi Mu Industrial Engineering
Alpha Sigma Mu Materials Science Engineering
Chi Epsilon Civil Engineering
Eta Kappa Nu  Electrical/Computer Engineering
Kappa Kappa Psi Music
Phi Alpha Theta History
Phi Beta Delta  International
Phi Beta Kappa  Liberal Arts
Phi Eta Sigma  Freshman Honors
Phi Sigma Pi 
Phi Sigma Tau Philosophy
Pi Tau Sigma Mechanical Engineering
Sigma Alpha Pi  Leadership
Sigma Tau Delta English
Sigma Xi  Research
Tau Beta Pi Engineering

1. Non-Affiliated with the Association of College Honor Societies

Spirit and traditions
Lehigh students have several lasting traditions: Lehigh's school colors, brown and white, date back to 1874, and the school newspaper of the same name was first published in 1894.

Following the death of Asa Packer in May 1879, the university established "Founder's Day" to be held in October to remember and recognize those have contributed to the success of the university. The event remains an annual tradition.

Freshmen are traditionally inducted into the university in a convocation in the Zoellner Arts Center and welcomed at a Freshman-Alumni Rally where their class flag is given to them by the class from fifty years before.

Until the 1970s, freshmen wore small brown hats with their class numbers called "dinks" from the beginning of the fall semester until the Lafayette football game. The week leading up to the big game was full of festivities created to unite the students and fuel spirit. In one of these events, "The Pajama Parade," the freshmen were led across the penny toll bridge in their pajamas singing "We Pay No Tolls Tonight" to the Moravian University dormitories where they would serenade the women. The week before the game still involves decoration of the Greek houses, a bonfire, parties, rallies and the Marching 97 performing unexpectedly during classes the Friday before the game.

The Clery Act 

On April 5, 1986, Jeanne Clery, a 19-year-old Lehigh freshman, was raped and murdered in her dorm room; the perpetrator was apprehended, tried and sentenced to death. The backlash against unreported crimes on numerous campuses across the country led to the Jeanne Clery Disclosure of Campus Security Policy and Campus Crime Statistics Act. The Clery Act requires that colleges reveal information regarding crime on their campuses.

20 years after the federal Jeanne Clery Disclosure of Campus Security Policy and Campus Crime Statistics Act took effect, thought leaders on campus safety came to Lehigh to discuss critical safety issues for colleges and universities. The event, "Proceeding in Partnership: The Future of Campus Safety," was held on the Lehigh campus in September 2011, and was co-sponsored by Security on Campus (SOC), which was founded by Connie and Howard Clery following the death of their daughter, Jeanne Clery. The conference represented the first cooperative effort between Lehigh and the organization since Jeanne Clery's death.

Notable people

Alumni 

Notable alumni include:
 Pongpol Adireksarn, deputy prime minister of Thailand
 Ali Al-Naimi, former Minister of Petroleum and Mineral Resources of Saudi Arabia
 Martin Baron, editor of The Washington Post
 Lynn S. Beedle, National Academy of Engineering member, founder and director of the Council on Tall Buildings and Urban Habitat, Frank P. Brown Medal recipient, John Fritz Medal recipient, and Deputy Office in Charge of the Nuclear testing at Bikini Atoll in 1946
 Stephen J. Benkovic, chemist and National Medal of Science recipient
 Harry J. Buncke, "father of microsurgery"
 Steve Chang, co-founder and former CEO of Trend Micro
 Stacey Cunningham, 67th president of the New York Stock Exchange
 Charlie Dent, U.S. Representative for Pennsylvania's 15th congressional district
 Henry Sturgis Drinker, mechanical engineer for the Lehigh Valley Railroad and president of Lehigh University, 1905–1920
 Robert Durst, convicted serial killer and the subject of The Jinx, a 2015 HBO miniseries
 Cathy Engelbert, WNBA commissioner and former CEO of Deloitte
 John W. Fisher, National Academy of Engineering member, founding director of the ATLSS Engineering Center, and Frank P. Brown Medal Laureate
 Theodore V. Galambos, National Academy of Engineering member and considered by the American Institute of Steel Construction the "Father of LRFD"
 James Geurts, Assistant Secretary of the Navy (Research, Development and Acquisition)
 Terry Hart, NASA astronaut
 Richard Hayne, co-founder of Urban Outfitters
 Lee Iacocca, longtime CEO of Chrysler Corporation
 Thomas R. Kline, lawyer, namesake and benefactor of the Drexel University Thomas R. Kline School of Law
 CJ McCollum, professional basketball player in the NBA currently a member of the New Orleans Pelicans
 Paul Marcincin, former two time mayor of Bethlehem from 1978 to 1988 and from 1997 to 1998. Creator of Musikfest.
 Thomas William McNamara, United States Navy rear admiral
 Joe Morgenstern, film critic and Pulitzer Prize winner
 James Ward Packard, founder of the Packard Motor Car Company
 Roger Penske, founder of Penske Corporation, recipient of the Presidential Medal of Freedom
 Austin Price, basketball player in the Israeli Premier Basketball League
 Billy Rhoades, mathematician and university professor
 Jesse W. Reno, inventor of the escalator
 Stephanie Ruhle, MSNBC journalist
 Jeffrey Scott, founder of Silicon Laboratories
 Michael Smerconish, SiriusXM radio host and CNN television presenter
 John H. Tilelli Jr., U.S. Army General and Commander of United States Army Forces Command
 Wendell Weeks, CEO and chairman of Corning Inc, member of the board of directors of Amazon.com
 William Wiswesser, chemist and pioneer in chemical informatics

Faculty
Notable faculty members include: 
 Sirry Alang, professor of sociology and public health researcher
 Elsa Reichmanis, Perkin Medal recipient and Anderson Endowed Chair in Chemical and Biomolecular Engineering 
 Helen M. Chan, New Jersey Zinc Professor of material science and engineering
 Michael Behe, professor of biochemistry, and intelligent design advocate
 Dan M. Frangopol, professor of structural engineering and inaugural holder of the Fazlur R. Khan Endowed Chair of Structural Engineering and Architecture
 Terry Hart, professor of mechanical engineering and former NASA astronaut
 Joanna B. Michlic, professor of Polish-Jewish history
 Norman Melchert, Selfridge Professor of Philosophy from 1962 until his retirement in 1995
 Francis J. Quirk, professor of art from 1950 to 1973
 Stephanie Powell Watts, professor of English and award-winning author
 Ferdinand P. Beer, the first chair of the Department of Mechanical engineering, professor of mechanical engineering from 1947 to 1984, wrote several textbooks influential to engineering education

Honorary degrees
Bill Cosby was awarded an honorary degree in 1987 when he delivered the university's commencement address. Lehigh revoked the degree in October 2015 following the allegations of sexual assault by more than 40 women.

Donald Trump was awarded an honorary degree in 1988 when he delivered the university's commencement address. Lehigh revoked the degree in January 2021 following the January 6 United States Capitol attack.

See also
Lehigh University Press

References

External links

Lehigh Athletics website

 
1865 establishments in Pennsylvania
Bethlehem, Pennsylvania
Drinker family
Eastern Pennsylvania Rugby Union
Educational institutions established in 1865
Patriot League
Private universities and colleges in Pennsylvania
Technological universities in the United States
Universities and colleges in Northampton County, Pennsylvania